Roma Arora is an Indian television actress. She has appeared on the serial Kundali Bhagya. She has also appeared in television shows like Dreamgirl on Life OK.

Career
Born to doctor Parents in Delhi, Roma Arora is a Homeopathic physician who chose acting and modeling over medicine. She has been featured in TV advertisements for products such Oral B toothpaste, and Valvoline motor oil with Virat Kohli. She has also done photo shoots for magazines like Woman's Era.

She also appeared with Vivek Oberoi in Amazon's first original Indian film – Inside Edge - where she played a journalist named Ritika Jain. In the upcoming Colors TV show, Khauff, Roma Arora will be playing the role of a killer ghost.

Television
 Kundali Bhagya
 CID
 Nisha Aur Uske Cousins
 Kaun Hai?
 Udaan

References

External links
 

Living people
1991 births
Actresses from Delhi
Indian television actresses